Christian Richard Wück (born 9 June 1973) is a German former professional footballer who played as an attacking midfielder or as a winger. He is now coach of the Germany Under-16 national team.

Honours
Karlsruher SC
 DFB-Pokal finalist: 1995–96

References

External links
  

1973 births
Living people
German footballers
German football managers
Germany under-21 international footballers
1. FC Schweinfurt 05 players
1. FC Nürnberg players
Karlsruher SC players
VfL Wolfsburg players
Arminia Bielefeld players
Bundesliga players
2. Bundesliga players
Rot Weiss Ahlen managers
2. Bundesliga managers
Holstein Kiel managers
Association football midfielders
3. Liga managers
People from Schweinfurt (district)
Sportspeople from Lower Franconia
Footballers from Bavaria